This is a list of hospital in Guinea.  In 2019, there were 1,746 medical facilities in Guinea, including 35 public hospitals at the national, regional, and prefecture level.

Hospitals

The following is a list of hospitals that includes the location and type hospital.   A link to a map showing these hospitals is at the bottom of the table.

References

Hospitals in Guinea
Guinea
Guinea